Kosmos 110 ( meaning Kosmos 110) was a Soviet spacecraft launched on 22 February 1966 from the Baikonur Cosmodrome aboard a Voskhod rocket. It carried two dogs, Veterok and Ugolyok.

Mission 
The launch of Kosmos 110 was conducted using a Voskhod 11A57 s/n R15000-06 carrier rocket, which flew from Site 31/6 at Baikonour. The launch occurred at 20:09:36 GMT on 22 February 1966.

It incorporated a re-entry body (capsule) for landing scientific instruments and test objects. It was a biological satellite that made a sustained biomedical experiment through the Van Allen radiation belts with the dogs Veterok and Ugolyok. In addition to the two dogs, several species of plants, moisturized prior to launch, were also carried. On 16 March 1966, after 22 days in orbit around the Earth, they landed safely and were recovered by recovery forces at 14:09 GMT.The dogs had orbited the Earth 330 times.

Results from the mission showed that whilst some beans germinated poorly, lettuce grew larger all around with 50% more yield and Chinese cabbage showed greater mass. Those that germinated in space thus became the first seeds to do so.
Overall the mission showed that long duration space flight had definite but variable effects on plants, with some producing better results than on Earth.

The two dogs showed severe dehydration, weight loss, loss of muscle and coordination and took several weeks to fully recover.

This spaceflight of record-breaking duration was not surpassed by humans until Soyuz 11 in June 1971 and still stands as the longest space flight by dogs.

See also 

 1966 in spaceflight
 Animals in space
 Russian space dogs

References 

Kosmos satellites
1966 in the Soviet Union
1966 in spaceflight
Spacecraft launched in 1966
Life in space